Youssou Lo (born 19 March 1992) is a Senegalese footballer who plays for Olhanense.

Club career
Born in Dakar, Senegal, Lo joined Italian club Udinese Calcio at young age. In 2011 Lo joined Serie B club Vicenza. He made his Serie B debut on 25 August 2012, the first round of 2012–13 Serie B. In January 2013 he left for Slovenian club Celje.

On 12 August 2014 Lo was sold to Serie A club Internazionale. He was immediately left for Portuguese club Olhanense in order to give Inter a non-EU signing quota for international transfer for Chilean Gary Medel.

References

External links
 Lega Serie A profile 
 AIC profile (data by football.it) 

Senegalese footballers
Udinese Calcio players
L.R. Vicenza players
NK Celje players
S.C. Olhanense players
Serie B players
Association football forwards
Senegalese expatriate footballers
Expatriate footballers in Italy
Expatriate footballers in Slovenia
Senegalese expatriate sportspeople in Italy
Senegalese expatriate sportspeople in Slovenia
Footballers from Dakar
1992 births
Living people